Jill Michelle Dillard (née Duggar; born May 17, 1991) is an American television personality. She is known for her appearances on TLC as part of the reality television shows 19 Kids and Counting (2008-2015) and Counting On (2015-2017). She also co-authored a book with her sisters Jana, Jessa, and Jinger titled Growing Up Duggar: It's All About Relationships.

Personal life
Dillard was born in Tontitown, Arkansas, as the fourth child and the second daughter of Jim Bob and Michelle Duggar. On June 21, 2014, she married Derick Michael Dillard. They have three sons together. In 2015, the Dillard family relocated to Central America to serve as missionaries with S.O.S. Ministries. Ten months later, they returned to the United States.

Career

Television
Dillard began her public life as a member of the family featured in the documentary 14 Children and Pregnant Again (2004), which talks about daily life of the family from the "time they wake up" to the "time they go to sleep". The documentary aired on the Discovery Health Channel. Another documentary, Raising 16 Children was produced on the same channel in 2006, when her sister Johannah was born. This was followed by another feature, On the Road with 16 Children about a family cross-country trip.

On September 29, 2008, 19 Kids and Counting (formerly 18 Kids and Counting and 17 Kids and Counting) began as a regular series based on the Duggar family. The show was cancelled in 2015 following several scandals surrounding her brother Josh. Another series, Jill & Jessa: Counting On, starring Dillard and her sister Jessa, premiered on December 13, 2015. Jill and her family dropped out of the show in 2017.

Books
Dillard co-wrote the book Growing Up Duggar: It's All About Relationships, published by Howard Books with her sisters Jana, Jessa and Jinger. It was released on March 4, 2014. The book shares an inside look at what being a Duggar child is like as they talk about their parents' faith and perspectives on life.

Midwife 
In 2015, Dillard became a Certified Professional Midwife (CPM) in Arkansas. However, her mentor Vanessa Giron's license was revoked after being found negligent in a birth. Neither Dillard nor Giron are licensed midwives in the state of Arkansas.

Sexual abuse victim
In June 2015 on The Kelly File, Dillard identified herself as one of the girls whom her oldest brother Joshua Duggar had molested as a teen. Dillard reported the abuse consisted of inappropriate touching while she was asleep, saying she did not know it had occurred until her brother confessed to her parents, and her parents then told her what had occurred. Dillard stated that the release of the police reports was a "revictimization", and she expressed concern that the police reports detailing her abuse being made public might discourage other families experiencing abuse from seeking help.

References

Duggar family
Participants in American reality television series
21st-century American women writers
Writers from Arkansas
American midwives
Child sexual abuse in the United States
Incestual abuse
People from Washington County, Arkansas
1991 births
Living people